Jakob Heinrich von Flemming (3 March 1667 – 30 April 1728) was a Saxon count, military officer and politician. He was born in Hoff, Prussian Province of Pomerania to a noble family. He completed his law studies in 1688, after which he entered service with Brandenburg. He attained the rank of general in 1705 and Generalfeldmarschall in 1711.

He was appointed ambassador to Warsaw by elector Frederick Augustus of Saxony, who aspired to the throne of Poland–Lithuania which had been vacant since the death of Jan III Sobieski in 1696. By causing competition between the other aspirants, Flemming was able to secure the election of the elector as Augustus II of Poland–Lithuania.

Flemming participated in the Livonian campaign of the Great Northern War. His troops captured the fort Düna fort at Riga from the Swedes in 1700, renaming it "Augustenburg" ("August's fort"), but the Swedes defeated the allied Russian-Saxon army at the crossing of the Daugava in 1701. During the Battle of Kliszów in 1702 he was severely wounded.

In 1705 August made him general of the cavalry and Minister of War. At the Treaty of Altranstädt in 1706, Charles XII demanded of the deposed August the extradition of Flemming, arguing that he had estates in Swedish Pomerania and was therefore a Swedish citizen subject to Swedish law. Flemming relieved his Elector from this predicament by leaving for Prussia. When the Swedes left Poland in 1708 for their disastrous campaign in Russia (ending with the defeat at Poltava), the re-crowned August installed Flemming in the governor's residence in Dresden.

In 1711 Flemming became Generalfeldmarschall and led the Saxon troops in Northern Germany against the Swedes led by Magnus Stenbock. He participated in the sieges of Stralsund and Tönning, and led the Saxon troops in the Battle of Gadebusch in 1712.

After the victorious end of fighting in northern Germany in 1715, Flemming led the Saxon troops to Poland, supporting Augustus against the Tarnogród Confederation.

References 

1667 births
1728 deaths
Prussian Army personnel
Field marshals of Saxony
People from the Province of Pomerania
Jacob Heinrich
People of the Great Northern War